James Malcolm may refer to:

Baronets
Sir James Malcolm, 4th Baronet (died 1805) of the Malcolm baronets
Sir James Malcolm, 8th Baronet (1823–1901)  of the Malcolm baronets
Sir James William Malcolm, 9th Baronet (1862–1927) of the Malcolm baronets
Sir James William Thomas Alexander Malcolm, 12th Baronet (1930–2012) of the Malcolm baronets

Others
James Malcolm (politician) (1880–1935), Canadian politician
James Aratoon Malcolm (1868–?), British-Armenian financier, arms dealer and journalist
James Malcolm (Royal Marines officer) (1767–1849), Scottish officer of the British Royal Marines
James Peller Malcolm (1767–1815), American-English topographer and engraver
James Malcolm (rugby union) (born 1994), Scottish rugby union player

See also